Jugnu may refer to:
 Jugnu (1973 film), an Indian Hindi-language action film
 Jugnu (1947 film), an Indian musical romantic comedy film
 Jugnu (satellite), an Indian technology demonstration and remote sensing satellite